Lightwell Building (formerly City Center Square) is a skyscraper in Downtown Kansas City, Missouri, built by Skidmore, Owings & Merrill, in the Spring of 1977. It occupies the entire block of 11th Street to 12th Street, and from Main Street to Baltimore Street. Its tower is 30 stories tall, constructed with a reinforced concrete structure evident by the look of the exterior.

In 2003, the property was appraised at $38 million when Citigroup underwrote a $29 million loan. Net operating income was $3.1 million. As the real estate market rose, the property was re-appraised in February 2005 for $60 million and Ally Financial (formerly GMAC) underwrote a $44 million 10-year loan. This loan went delinquent in April 2010. An August 2010 appraisal estimated property value at $38 million, below the $41 million remaining principal.

City Center Square was renamed to the Lightwell Building in 2019.

Features
Lightwell is not only a business office but also a hotspot for food and retail in the Downtown area. The building is tall and stands out; the bottom floors "layer" from small to large , adding to the uniqueness of the building. Food services includes Jason's Deli. The food court is being remodeled into a food hall . Also included for convenience is a fitness center and a conference room.

References

 Restaurant and convenience guide
 Kansas City, Missouri; An Architectural History, 1826–1990. (Copyright 1992). George Ehrlich. Retrieved August 15, 2007. (Page 166)

External links
 

Skyscraper office buildings in Kansas City, Missouri
Skidmore, Owings & Merrill buildings
Office buildings completed in 1978
Downtown Kansas City